Peacock Island can refer to:

Peacock Island (Connecticut) in Stratford, Connecticut, United States
Umananda Island in Guwahati, Assam, India, called Peacock Island by the British

See also
Pfaueninsel in Berlin, Germany